The Battle of Moscow was a 1941–1942 battle during World War II.

Battle of Moscow may also refer to:
Battle of Prairie D'Ane in 1864 during the American Civil War
Battle of Moscow (1612) during the Polish–Muscovite War
Battle of Borodino in 1812 during the Napoleonic Wars
Advance on Moscow (1919), during the Russian Civil War
Battle of Moscow (film), a 1985 Soviet film on the 1941 battle

See also
Siege of Moscow (disambiguation)